Dongfeng could refer to the following towns in China:

Dongfeng, Chao'an County (东凤镇), Guangdong
Dongfeng, Zhongshan (东凤镇), Guangdong
Dongfeng, Dongfeng County (东丰镇), Jilin

Written as "东风镇":
Dongfeng, Guiyang, in Wudang District, Guiyang, Guizhou
Dongfeng, Weining County, in Weining Yi, Hui, and Miao Autonomous County, Guizhou
Dongfeng, Hailun, Heilongjiang
Dongfeng, Ejin Banner, Inner Mongolia
Dongfeng, Kailu County, Inner Mongolia
Dongfeng, Dawa County, Liaoning
Dongfeng, Shaanxi, in Long County